Confessions of a Cuckoo is 2021 Malayalam drama film directed by Jay Jithin Prakash starring Nehrin Navas, 
Prarthana Sandeep and Durga Krishna. The movie is based on a socially relevant topic, inspired by a real event.

Synopsis
Sherin is pursuing a journey through the lives of many children who went through brutal abuses in past. She meets with many people, learning their stories for her documentary including the stories of Naseema and Anna which makes a change turn to Sherin's past.

Cast
Durga Krishna as Sherin
Nehrin Navas
Prarthana Sandeep as Anna
Arjun Nandakumar as Vinay

Reception
The movie received a mixed reviews. According to a review by Malayala Manorama, the film manages to capture the least reality of life within the headlines that are read over and over again every day in newspapers.

References

Films not released in theaters due to the COVID-19 pandemic
2021 films
2020s Malayalam-language films
2021 drama films
Indian drama films